Breeze Nan Jing is a shopping mall in Songshan District, Taipei, Taiwan that opened on September 1, 2013. It was first opened in 1983 and previously known as Asiaworld Shopping Mall. Core stores of the mall include Muji, Starbucks, and Uniqlo.

History
 The building of the mall was designed by Chu-Yuan Lee and construction began in December 1978.
 The mall officially opened in January 1983 and was named Asiaworld Shopping Mall.
 In January 2010, the mall was renamed to Momo Mall.
 On September 1, 2013, the mall was renamed again to Breeze Nan Jing, and was operated by Breeze Center.

Gallery

See also
 List of tourist attractions in Taiwan
 List of shopping malls in Taipei
 Breeze Center
 Breeze Song Gao

References

External links

 

1983 establishments in Taiwan
Shopping malls in Taipei
Shopping malls established in 1983